The Shire of York is a local government area in the Wheatbelt region of Western Australia, covering an area of  just beyond the eastern fringe of Perth's metropolitan area. The Shire's seat of government is the town of York.

History

The Shire of York was established as the York Road District on 24 January 1871. The townsite of York separated as the Municipality of York (later the Town of York) ten weeks later on 7 March 1871. It became a shire on 1 July 1961 following the passage of the Local Government Act 1960, which reformed all road districts into shires. The Town of York merged back into the shire on 15 March 1965.

Wards
The council was previously split into three wards - Town (4 councillors), West (2 councillors) and East (3 councillors) - but these were abolished and an election for 6 councillors for the entire Shire was held on 6 May 2006.

Towns and localities
The towns and localities of the Shire of York with population and size figures based on the most recent Australian census:

Notable councillors
 Frederick Monger, York Municipality councillor 1892; later a state MP
 Garnet Wood, York Road Board member 1932–1951; also a state MP

Heritage-listed places

As of 2023, 321 places are heritage-listed in the Shire of York, of which 34 are on the State Register of Heritage Places.

See also
 List of heritage places in York, Western Australia
 List of heritage places in the Shire of York

References

External links
 

 
York